AHAS may refer to:
 Acetolactate synthase, a protein, abbreviated ALS or AHAS
 ALS herbicides/AHAS herbicides, ALS inhibitors/AHAS inhibitors used as herbicides
 Avian Hazard Advisory System, a bird avoidance model developed by the United States Air Force